Marco Antonio Blásquez Salinas (born 7 May 1963) is a Mexican politician and journalist affiliated with the PT. He currently serves as Senator of the LXII Legislature of the Mexican Congress representing Baja California. He also was frequent collaborator of El Universal, President of the radio network Media Sport and Vice-president of Pacific Spanish Network.

References

1963 births
Living people
People from Tijuana
Mexican journalists
Male journalists
Labor Party (Mexico) politicians
Members of the Senate of the Republic (Mexico)
Politicians from Tijuana
Writers from Baja California
21st-century Mexican politicians
Mexican activists
Senators of the LXII and LXIII Legislatures of Mexico